The 2017 Georgia State Panthers softball team represented Georgia State University in the 2017 NCAA Division I softball season. The Panthers competed in the Sun Belt Conference and were led by seven-year head coach Roger Kincaid.  Georgia State played its home games at the Robert E. Heck Softball Complex in Panthersville, Georgia.

Roster

Schedule

! style="background:#0000FF;color:white;"| Regular season
|- valign="top" 

|- align="center" bgcolor="#ccffcc"
| 1 || February 10 || Western Kentucky || Starkville, MS || 13-1 || 1-0 || -
|- align="center" bgcolor="#ffccc"
| 2 || February 10 || Mississippi State || Starkville, MS || 4-0 || 1-1 || -
|- align="center" bgcolor="#ccffcc"
| 3 || February 11 || Stephen F. Austin || Starkville, MS || 3-1 || 2-1 || -
|- align="center" bgcolor="#ccffcc"
| 4 || February 11 || Western Kentucky || Starkville, MS || 2-1 || 3-1 || -
|- align="center" bgcolor="#ccffcc"
| 5 || February 12 || Mississippi State || Starkville, MS || 3-1 || 4-1 || -
|- align="center" bgcolor="#ffccc"
| 6 || February 15 || Georgia Tech || Bob Heck Field || 8-3 || 4-2 || -
|- align="center" bgcolor="#ccffcc"
| 7 || February 17 || South Carolina State || Jacksonville, FL || 8-0 || 5-2 || -
|- align="center" bgcolor="#ccffcc"
| 8 || February 17 || Kansas || Jacksonville, FL || 5-34|| 6-2 || -
|- align="center" bgcolor="#ccffcc"
| 9 || February 18 || South Dakota State || Jacksonville, FL || 5-4 || 7-2 || -
|- align="center" bgcolor="#ffccc"
| 10 || February 18 || North Florida || Jacksonville, FL || 7-6 || 7-3 || -
|- align="center" bgcolor="#ccffcc"
| 11 || February 22 || Mercer || Macon, GA || 8-4 || 8-3 || -
|- align="center" bgcolor="#ffccc"
| 12 || February 24 || Villanova || Bob Heck Field || 6-0 || 8-4 || -
|- align="center" bgcolor="#ccffcc"
| 13 || February 24 || Illinois || Bob Heck Field || 13-4 || 9-4 || -
|- align="center" bgcolor="#ffccc"
| 14 || February 25 || Omaha || Bob Heck Field || 3-1 || 9-5 || -
|- align="center" bgcolor="#ccffcc"
| 15 || February 25 || Omaha || Bob Heck Field || 12-4 || 10-5 || -
|- align="center" bgcolor="#ffccc"
| 16 || February 26 || Radford || Bob Heck Field || 1-7 || 10-6 || -
|-

|- align="center" bgcolor="#ffccc"
| 17 || March 3 || Syracuse || Tampa, FL || 5-2 || 10-7 || -
|- align="center" bgcolor="#ffccc"
| 18 || March 3 || South Florida || Tampa, FL || 1-0 || 10-8 || -
|- align="center" bgcolor="#ccffcc"
| 19 || March 4 || Villanova || Tampa, FL || 4-3 || 11-8 || -
|- align="center" bgcolor="#ccffcc"
| 20 || March 4 || Hartford || Tampa, FL || 16-1 || 12-8 || -
|- align="center" bgcolor="#ccffcc"
| 21 || March 5 || Central Michigan || Tampa, FL || 6-4 || 13-8 || -
|- align="center" bgcolor="#ffccc"
| 22 || March 7 || Michigan State || Bob Heck Field || 2-5 || 13-9 || -
|- align="center" bgcolor="#ccffcc"
| 23 || March 11 || South Alabama || Bob Heck Field || 2-0 || 14-9 || 1-0
|- align="center" bgcolor="#ccffcc"
| 24 || March 11 || South Alabama || Bob Heck Field || 11-3 || 15-9 || 2-0
|- align="center" bgcolor="#ccffcc"
| 25 || March 12 || South Alabama || Bob Heck Field || 4-3 || 16-9 || 3-0
|- align="center" bgcolor="#fffccc"
| 26 || March 14 || Notre Dame || Bob Heck Field || Cancelled || - || -
|- align="center" bgcolor="#ffccc"
| 27 || March 18 || Troy || Troy, AL || 3-4 || 16-10 || 3-1
|- align="center" bgcolor="#ccffcc"
| 28 || March 18 || Troy || Troy, AL || 6-5 || 17-10 || 4-1
|- align="center" bgcolor="#ffccc"
| 29 || March 19 || Troy || Troy, AL || 9-7 || 17-11 || 4-2
|- align="center" bgcolor="#ccffcc"
| 30 || March 22 || Kennesaw State || Bob Heck Field || 6-4 || 18-11 || 4-2
|- align="center" bgcolor="#ccffcc"
| 31 || March 25 || Appalachian State || Bob Heck Field || 12-2 || 19-11 || 5-2
|- align="center" bgcolor="#ccffcc"
| 32 || March 25 || Appalachian State || Bob Heck Field || 5-3 || 20-11 || 6-2
|- align="center" bgcolor="#ccffcc"
| 33 || March 26 || Appalachian State || Bob Heck Field || 9-4 || 21-11 || 7-2
|- align="center" bgcolor="#ccffcc"
| 34 || March 29 || Georgia Tech || Atlanta, GA || 9-5 || 22-11 || 7-2
|-

|- align="center" bgcolor="#ccffcc"
| 35 || April 1 || Texas State || San Marcos, TX || 5-3 || 23-11 || 8-2
|- align="center" bgcolor="#ffccc"
| 36 || April 1 || Texas State || San Marcos, TX || 7-5 || 23-12 || 8-3
|- align="center" bgcolor="#ccffcc"
| 37 || April 2 || Texas State || San Marcos, TX || 4-0 || 24-12 || 9-3
|- align="center" bgcolor="#fffccc"
| 38 || April 5 || Furman || Bob Heck Field || Cancelled || - || -
|- align="center" bgcolor="#ccffcc"
| 39 || April 8 || UT Arlington || Bob Heck Field || 3-2 || 25-12 || 10-3
|- align="center" bgcolor="#ccffcc"
| 40 || April 8 || UT Arlington || Bob Heck Field || 10-6 || 26-12 || 11-3
|- align="center" bgcolor="#ffccc"
| 41 || April 9 || UT Arlington || Bob Heck Field || 3-7 || 26-13 || 11-4
|- align="center" bgcolor="#ffccc"
| 42 || April 11 || Kennesaw State || Kennesaw, GA || 6-5 || 26-14 || 11-4
|- align="center" bgcolor="#ffccc"
| 43 || April 12 || Auburn || Auburn, AL || 3-6 || 26-15 || 11-4
|- align="center" bgcolor="#ccffcc"
| 44 || April 14 || Coastal Carolina || Conway, SC || 8-1 || 27-15 || 12-4
|- align="center" bgcolor="#ffccc"
| 45 || April 14 || Coastal Carolina || Conway, SC || 2-8 || 27-16 || 12-5
|- align="center" bgcolor="#ccffcc"
| 46 || April 15 || Coastal Carolina || Conway, SC || 5-1 || 28-16 || 13-5
|- align="center" bgcolor="#ffccc"
| 47 || April 19 || #22 Georgia || Athens, GA || 11-1 || 28-17 || 13-5
|- align="center" bgcolor="#ffccc"
| 48 || April 22 || #17 Louisiana || Lafayette, LA || 4-19 || 28-18 || 13-6
|- align="center" bgcolor="#ffccc"
| 49 || April 22 || #17 Louisiana || Lafayette, LA || 1-7 || 28-19 || 13-7
|- align="center" bgcolor="#ffccc"
| 50 || April 23 || #17 Louisiana || Lafayette, LA || 6-14 || 28-20 || 13-8
|- align="center" bgcolor="#ccffcc"
| 51 || April 29 || ULM || Bob Heck Field || 3-2 || 29-20 || 14-8
|- align="center" bgcolor="#ccffcc"
| 52 || April 29 || ULM || Bob Heck Field || 5-2 || 30-20 || 15-8
|- align="center" bgcolor="#ffccc"
| 53 || April 30 || ULM || Bob Heck Field || 5-6 || 30-21 || 15-9
|-

|- align="center" bgcolor="#ccffcc"
| 54 || May 5 || Georgia Southern || Statesboro, GA || 5-3 || 31-21 || 16-9
|- align="center" bgcolor="#ccffcc"
| 55 || May 6 || Georgia Southern || Statesboro, GA || 9-1 || 32-21 || 17-9
|- align="center" bgcolor="#ccffcc"
| 56 || May 6 ||  Georgia Southern || Statesboro, GA || 15-0 || 33-21 || 18-9
|-

|- align="center" bgcolor="#ccffcc"
| 57 || May 10 || (7) Troy || Troy, AL || 5-2 || 34-21 || (1-0)
|- align="center" bgcolor="#ffccc"
| 57 || May 11 || (2) Texas State || Troy, AL || 2-5 || 34-22 || (1-1)
|- align="center" bgcolor="#ffccc"
| 57 || May 11 || (5) UT Arlington || Troy, AL || 9-8 || 34-23 || (1-2)
|-

|- align="center" bgcolor="#ccffcc"
| 57 || May 16 || (3) UT Martin || Bob Heck Field || 6-5 || 35-23 || (1-0)
|- align="center" bgcolor="#ffccc"
| 58 || May 17 || (1) Kennesaw State || Bob Heck Field || 3-5 || 35-24 || (1-1)
|- align="center" bgcolor="#ccffcc"
| 59 || May 18 || (4) Western Kentucky || Bob Heck Field || 3-5 || 35-24 || (2-1)
|- align="center" bgcolor="#ffccc"
| 60 || May 18 || (1) Kennesaw State || Bob Heck Field || 2-3 || 35-25 || (2-2)
|-

|

References

Georgia State
Georgia State Panthers softball seasons